The Duane G. Meyer Library serves the Missouri State University campus in Springfield, Missouri.

Information
Built in 1980 and extensively renovated in 2002, it houses 877,000 books, subscriptions and back issues of over 3,500 periodicals, and online access to over 20,000 periodicals.  The renovation added more than thirty group study rooms and stations and a dedicated Special Collections and Archives facility.

Meyer Library serves as a state, federal, and United Nations depository, with over 934,000 documents available from those bodies.

Contained within the library are the specialized Maps and Music library collections, as well as the Curriculum Resource Center for current and future educators.

One notable feature of the Duane G. Meyer Library is the Jane A. Meyer Carillon bell tower, which contains 48 bronze bells that chime every quarter-hour.

External links
http://libraries.missouristate.edu/

Library buildings completed in 1980
Buildings and structures in Springfield, Missouri
Libraries in Missouri
Missouri State University
University and college academic libraries in the United States